Jack Adam Mikrut is a Swedish photographer based in Brisbane, Australia. Born in Krakow, Poland, he emigrated to Canada  at an early age. He lived in Luseland, Saskatchewan and Winnipeg, Manitoba  before moving to Sweden in 1975.

Background
Jack commenced his career as freelance photographer in 1982. His first larger project was documenting the work of Swedish consultants VBB, now Sweco, in Egypt as they studied tombs in the Valley of the Queens and other Egyptian monuments in order to devise a plan of action to save them from saline corrosion.

In 1984 he began work as a staff photographer at the Swedish national daily newspaper Svenska Dagbladet and was accepted as a member of the picture agency Tiofoto. His international assignments included, among others, a feature on UNDP missions in Mali and Burkina Faso and coverage of the refugee situation after the Iran–Iraq War in 1988 for the Swedish Red Cross.

In 1991 he joined the staff of Pressens Bild, now Scanpix, picture agency. He specialised in news, and sports photography covering most major sports events, including 6 Olympic Games.
Since 1990 he has been the recipient of  numerous national and international honors, such as the 2001 Fuji European Sport Photographer of the Year award. In 2002 his black and white portfolio portraying swimmer Emma Igelström placed first in the competition by French sports newspaper LÉquipe and the International Olympic Committee (IOC).

Jack is currently employed as staff photographer at Dagens Industri, a daily business newspaper based in Stockholm Sweden. He is also collaborating as official photographer for the Swedish Olympic Committee and as a consultant on business photography for Activated Logic, Australia.

Awards
 1990   Swedish Picture of The Year    3rd prize Humour
 1992   Swedish Picture of The Year    2nd prize Portrait
 World Press Photo diploma excellent work Sport singles
 1993   Swedish Picture of The Year    3rd prize Sport Portfolio  /  3rd prize Open category
 1994   Swedish Picture of The Year     1st prize Humour
 1998   Swedish Picture of The Year     2nd prize Sport Portfolio
 1999   Sport Fuji Press Photo Award Sweden   1st prize
 2000 Swedish Picture of The Year 3rd prize Spot News  / 3rd prize Sport Stories
 2001 Swedish Picture of The Year    1st prize Sport Feature Stories  / 2nd prize Sport Feature singles / 2nd prize Sport Action /  3rd prize Sport Feature Stories
 2001  1st prize Sport Fuji Euro Press Photo Award Sweden
 2002 Fuji European Sport Photographer of the Year
 2002  1st prize Black & White Portfolio Sports competition by IOC and L'Équipe
 2003 Swedish Picture of The Year    2nd prize  /   World Handball Photo of The Year 1st prize
 2004 62nd POYi USA Contest   3rd prize Sports singles
 2005 Swedish Picture of The Year    3rd prize  News
 2007 Swedish Picture of The Year    1st prize Portrait
 2007 Society for News Design Award of Excellence photography /single photos
 2010  Wieliczka Salt Mine Through the Lens] 1st prize Works by Miners category, Wieliczka Salt Mine Through the Lens distinction Saline Labyrinth category
 2011 68th POYi USA Contest Award of Excellence Portrait category

Exhibitions
 2005 Digital Photo Fair Sollentuna  exhibition: "Travelling with the Crown Princess"
 2006 Home & Digital Fair Stockholm  exhibition: "Travelling with the Crown Princess"
 2006 TUR Travel Fair Gothenburg exhibition: "Travelling with the Crown Princess"
 2007 Digital Home and Photo Fair Stockholm exhibition: "Portraits"

References

External links
 Jack Mikrut blog archive
 
 Sportsshooter
Swedish Olympic Committee 

Swedish photographers
Sports photographers
Living people
Portrait photographers
Year of birth missing (living people)